The United Nations Congress on Crime Prevention and Criminal Justice is a United Nations (UN) sponsored congress on the topics of crime, crime prevention and criminal justice, held every five years. It is organized by the United Nations Office on Drugs and Crime (UNODC). Participants of the Congress include UN Member States and Observers, international organizations, non-governmental organization and individual experts.

The Commission on Crime Prevention and Criminal Justice acts ave agenda items of the upcoming Crime Congress and to make action-oriented recommendations to serve as a basis for the draft recommendations and conclusions for consideration by the Congress.

The event was initially held in 1955, following the dissolution of the International Penal and Penitentiary Commission (IPPC) by the United Nations General Assembly in 1950. Initially called the United Nations Congress on the Prevention of Crime and the Treatment of Offenders, the current name was adopted in 2005.

The antecedents of the Congress on Crime Prevention and Criminal Justice include the First International Congress on the Prevention and Repression of Crime, held at London in 1872.

List of Congresses
Source:

Notes

External links
UN Crime Congress

Criminal justice
International criminal law
United Nations conferences